Anthelmintics or antihelminthics are a group of antiparasitic drugs that expel parasitic worms (helminths) and other internal parasites from the body by either stunning or killing them and without causing significant damage to the host. They may also be called vermifuges (those that stun) or vermicides (those that kill). Anthelmintics are used to treat people who are infected by helminths, a condition called helminthiasis. These drugs are also used to treat infected animals.

Pills containing anthelmintics are used in mass deworming campaigns of school-aged children in many developing countries. The drugs of choice for soil-transmitted helminths are mebendazole and albendazole; for schistosomiasis and tapeworms it is praziquantel.

Types
Antiparasitics that specifically target worms of the genus Ascaris are called ascaricides.

 Benzimidazoles:
 Albendazole – effective against threadworms, roundworms, whipworms, tapeworms, hookworms
 Mebendazole – effective against various nematodes 
 Thiabendazole – effective against various nematodes 
 Fenbendazole – effective against various parasites
 Triclabendazole – effective against liver flukes
 Flubendazole – effective against most intestinal parasites
 Avermectins (including ivermectin) - effective against most common intestinal worms, except tapeworms, for which praziquantel is commonly used in conjunction for mass dewormings
 Diethylcarbamazine – effective against Wuchereria bancrofti, Brugia malayi, Brugia timori, and Loa loa
 Pyrantel pamoate – effective against most nematode infections residing within the intestines 
 Levamisole
 Salicylanilide – mitochondrial un-couplers (used only for flatworm infections):
Niclosamide 
Oxyclozanide
 Nitazoxanide – readily kills Ascaris lumbricoides, and also possess  antiprotozoal effects 
 Oxamniquine – effective against flatworms (e.g., tapeworms and schistosoma)
 Praziquantel – effective against flatworms (e.g., tapeworms and schistosoma)
 Octadepsipeptides (e.g. Emodepside) – effective against a variety of gastrointestinal helminths
 Monepantel (aminoacetonitrile class) - effective against a variety of nematodes including those resistant to other anthelmintic classes
 Spiroindoles (e.g. derquantel) -  effective against a variety of nematodes including those resistant to other anthelmintic classes
 Artemisinin – shows anthelmintic activity

Anthelmintic resistance
Anthelmintic resistance in parasites is now widespread. It is a major threat to the sustainability of modern ruminant livestock production, resulting in reduced productivity, compromised animal health and welfare, and increased greenhouse gas emissions through increased parasitism and farm inputs. A database of published and unpublished European AR research on gastrointestinal nematodes was collated in 2020. A total of 197 publications were available for analysis, representing 535 studies in 22 countries and spanning the period 1980–2020. Results in sheep and goats since 2010 reveal an average prevalence of resistance to benzimidazoles of 86%, macrocyclic lactones except moxidectin 52%, levamisole 48%, and moxidectin 21%. All major gastrointestinal nematodes genera survived treatment in various studies. In cattle, prevalence of anthelminthic resistance varied between anthelmintic classes from 0–100% (benzimidazoles and macrocyclic lactones), 0–17% (levamisole) and 0–73% (moxidectin), and both Cooperia and Ostertagia survived treatment. 

The ability of parasites to survive treatments that are generally effective at the recommended doses is a major threat to the future control of worm parasites in small ruminants and horses. This is especially true of nematodes, and has helped spur development of aminoacetonitrile derivatives for treatment against drug-resistant nematodes, as well as exploration of doxycycline to kill their endosymbiotic Wolbachia bacteria.

The resistance is measured by the "fecal egg count reduction" value which varies for different types of helminths.

Treatment with an antihelminthic drug kills worms whose phenotype renders them susceptible to the drug, but resistant parasites survive and pass on their "resistance" genes. Resistant varieties accumulate, and treatment failure finally occurs.

See also 
 Dysphania ambrosioides, an herb native to Central and South America
 Santonin, a historical anthelmintic no longer in use

References

External links
 
 Holden-Dye, L. and Walker, R.J.Anthelmintic drugs (November 2, 2007), WormBook, ed. The C. elegans Research Community, WormBook, doi/10.1895/wormbook.1.143.1 

Articles containing video clips